Lassipora, also known as Lassipur, is a sub tehsil in Pulwama district of Jammu Kashmir, India. It is located 8 km towards southeast of Pulwama and 19 km towards 
west of Anantnag.

References

Cities and towns in Pulwama district